Alistair McDowall is an English playwright who grew up in Great Broughton in North Yorkshire. His play Brilliant Adventures was awarded a Bruntwood Prize in 2011.

His plays include The Glow, all of it, and X at the Royal Court Theatre, Pomona at the Orange Tree Theatre, Talk Show at the Royal Court Theatre, Captain Amazing at the Edinburgh Fringe and Soho Theatre, and Brilliant Adventures at the Royal Exchange Theatre.

His play Pomona transferred to the National Theatre and the Royal Exchange Theatre in Autumn 2015.
His play for young people Zero for the Young Dudes! was produced by National Theatre Connections in 2017. He lives in Manchester.

References

Living people
English male dramatists and playwrights
People from Broughton, Cumbria
Year of birth missing (living people)
21st-century British dramatists and playwrights
21st-century English male writers